Marlow is a city in Stephens County, Oklahoma, United States. The population was 4,662 at the 2010 census.

Geography
Marlow is located in northern Stephens County, in the southern part of the state, at  (34.643410, -97.958806).

History

Born along the Chisholm Trail and on the banks of Wild Horse Creek the legend of the Marlow family and the five Marlow brothers has been proven to be more fact than fiction.

Dr. Williamson Marlow and his wife, Martha Jane, a relative of Daniel Boone, first established a homestead in this area during the early 1880s. The site of the original Marlow family home is reported to have been located just north of Redbud Park.

Somewhat of a nomad by nature, Dr. Marlow provided medical treatment to the many settlers in this portion of Indian Territory and to many cowboys driving cattle up the Chisholm Trail. He also farmed while his sons reportedly herded horses, selling many of the animals to the U.S. Army located at neighboring Ft. Sill. Dr. Marlow died in 1885.

In 1888 his five sons were accused of horse-stealing, a charge which was later proven to be unfounded. Four of the brothers (Charlie, Alfred, Boone and Lewellyn) were arrested and transported by a U.S. Deputy Marshall to the Federal Court in Graham, Texas, for trial.

Hearing of this brother's arrest, George Marlow took the entire family to Graham to clear his brothers but soon found himself behind bars.

Boone Marlow ultimately escaped and returned to the Marlow area in Indian Territory, while his four brothers were scheduled to be transported to an ostensibly safer jail in Weatherford, Texas.

Several attempts were made by Graham citizens and law enforcement officials to lynch the Marlows. On the night of January 19, 1889, the brothers were shackled in pairs—George to Lewellyn and Charlie to Alfred—for the trip to Weatherford.

When the group reached Dry Creek outside of Graham, a signal was given and a hidden mob opened fire on the seemingly defenseless Marlows.

The guards ran to join the mob while the brothers leaped from the wagon and armed themselves with guns taken from guards. In the vicious gunfight that followed, Lewellyn and Alfred were killed. Both George and Charlie were seriously wounded.

Retrieving a dead mob member's knife, George Marlow unjointed his dead brother's ankles. He and Charlie used a wagon to escape the ambush site.

Three members of the mob were also killed and a number of others wounded. Several members of the mob were later prosecuted and convicted for the assault upon the brothers.

Boone was later poisoned near Hell Creek, west of Marlow. His corpse was then shot in an attempt to obtain a $1,500 reward, but his killers, too, were brought to trial.

Alfred, Boone and Lewellyn are buried in a small cemetery at what was once Finis, Texas outside of Graham.

George and Charlie Marlow survived the attack, eventually moving their families to Colorado where they became outstanding citizens, serving as law enforcement officers.

In 1891, after sentencing mob members for their part in the attack, Federal Judge A. P. McCormick was quoted as saying: "This is the first time in the annals of history where unarmed prisoners, shackled together, ever repelled a mob. Such cool courage that preferred to fight against such great odds and die, if at all, in glorious battle rather than die ignominiously by a frenzied mob, deserves to be commemorated in song and story.”

Demographics

As of the census of 2010, there were 4,662 people, 1,862 households, and 1,257 families residing in the city.  The population density was 657 people per square mile (253/km2). There were 2,119 housing units at an average density of 298.5 per square mile (115/km2). The racial makeup of the city was 87.2% white, 0.2% African American, 5.2% Native American, 0.2% Asian, 1.6% from other races, and 5.6% from two or more races.  Hispanics or Latinos were 4.4% of the population, having doubled since 2000.

There were 1,862 households, out of which half (50.1%) were married couples, a third (34.3%) included children under the age of 18, 12.6% had a female householder with no husband present, and 32.5% were non-families. of households were made up of individuals; 14.5% of households had someone living alone who was 65 years of age or older.  The average household size was 2.44 and the average family size was 3.

In the city, the population was spread out, with 25.8% under the age of 18, 7.5% from 18 to 24, 23.7% from 25 to 44, 24.4% from 45 to 64, and 18.6% who were 65 years of age or older.  The median age was 38.8 years.  For every 100 females, there were 88 males.  For every 100 females age 18 and over, there were 82 males.

The median income for a household in the city was $43,221, and the median income for a family was $57,713.  Males had a median income of $34,325 versus $29,21 for females.  The per capita income for the city was $20,299.  An estimated 10.7% of families and 15.2% of the population were below the poverty line, including 16.3% of those under age 18 and 12.7% of those age 65 or over.

Entertainment
Entertainment in Marlow includes: 
 Redbud Park located in the eastern part of the town that includes; the Hideout (a large playground), a trail through the park, a stage for concerts, and the Outlaw cave (the cave where the Marlows often hid out)
 The Life Center, a church funded recreational center that includes a basketball court, a walking track, and several rooms that can be rented
 Miller Park in the western part of the town that includes the public pool, Miller Pond, and the Mile trail
 Main Street shops & Restaurants

Education
The City of Marlow  is serviced by the Marlow Public School District.  Marlow High School is located near the center of town, and  Marlow Elementary School and Marlow Middle school are also located in town.

Notable people

 Keith Patterson, head football coach at NCAA Division I program, Abilene Christian University
 Terry Brown, former NFL defensive back for Minnesota Vikings
 Ross Coyle, gridiron football player
 Joe Dial, former world record-holder in pole vault, 2011 inductee into Pole Vault Hall of Fame
 Cady Groves (1989–2020), singer-songwriter
 Sam Hinkie, general manager of NBA's Philadelphia 76ers
 Barry Hinson, basketball head coach, Southern Illinois University
 Sonny Liles, football player
 James C. Nance, Oklahoma community newspaper chain publisher and former Speaker of the Oklahoma House of Representatives, President pro tempore of the Oklahoma Senate and member Uniform Law Commission
 Eula Pearl Carter Scott (1915–2005), became youngest female aviator in Oklahoma in 1929.
 Paul Sparks, Actor
 Samantha Harman, Behind the Chair Hair Show, the worlds largest finalist and recognized as a Top 5 Hairstylist worldwide in three separately awarded categories

References

Cities in Oklahoma
Cities in Stephens County, Oklahoma
Sundown towns in Oklahoma